Princess Helena Apolonia Massalska (1763-1815), was a Polish aristocrat and diarist.

Life
She was born as an only child of Prince Jozef Adrian Massalski (1700–1768) and his wife Princess Antonina Radziwill (1730-1764).

In 1779 she married Prince Charles-Joseph Antoine de Ligne (1759-1792) and in 1794 Count Vincent Potocki (1749-1825). She had one daughter from her first marriage, Princess Sidonie de Ligne, who married Count Francis Potocki (1788-1853), who was her stepfather's son from his first marriage to Anna Mycielska (1762-1829).

Legacy
She is known for her diary and her correspondence, which have been preserved and are regarded as an important source of contemporary life in Poland.

References

18th-century Polish–Lithuanian women writers
1815 deaths
1763 births
Polish diarists
Women letter writers
Helen Apolonia
Women diarists
18th-century letter writers
19th-century letter writers
18th-century diarists
19th-century diarists